Renken is a surname. Notable people with the surname include:

Brian Renken (born 1955), Canadian wrestler
Charles Renken (born 1993), American soccer player
Robert H. Renken (1921–2018), American politician

See also
Ranken